The women's hammer throw at the 2015 World Championships in Athletics was held at the Beijing National Stadium on 26 and 27 August.

The world championships also incorporated the 2015 IAAF Hammer Throw Challenge and Anita Włodarczyk was the series winner and world champion.

Competition
2015 was Anita Włodarczyk's year.  Already the world record holder, she threw the ball out to 81.08 less than four weeks before the championships to become the first woman to throw beyond 80 metres.  Włodarczyk is the returning silver medalist and was the 2009 champion.  The two-time defending champion and Olympic Champion Tatyana Lysenko, the number 3 thrower in history, did not return.  No Russian athletes competed in this event.  Zhang Wenxiu was the home favorite who has finished just behind Włodarczyk at every major championship (except 2011) since the Olympics were here seven years earlier.

The finals began with Włodarczyk throwing 74.40 to take the early lead in the first round.  Alexandra Tavernier was close with a 74.02.  In the second round, Włodarczyk threw 78.52, a distance which only three other women had ever achieved.  One of those three was Betty Heidler but her 72.56 in the second round would prove to be her best effort of the day.  At the end of the round Zhang threw 75.92 to move into second place.  On her third throw, Włodarczyk threw 80.27, a distance only she has achieved.  It was the second best throw in history.  A month earlier it would have been a world record, at this meet it was only her second best throw of the day as her fourth round 80.85 set the  Championship Record with a new second best throw in history.  Moments before, Zhang threw her best of the day, 76.33 to solidify her hold on silver.  Tavernier's first round throw held on for third, though Sophie Hitchon made a run at it with her British National Record 73.86 on her final toss.

Records
Prior to the competition, the records were as follows:

Qualification standards

Schedule

Results

Qualification
Qualification: Qualifying Performance 72.50 (Q) or at least 12 best performers (q) advanced to the final.

Final
The final was started at 19:00

References

Hammer throw
Hammer throw at the World Athletics Championships
2015 in women's athletics